Axoclinus is a genus of triplefins in the family Tripterygiidae. This genus has six described species. It is restricted to the eastern tropical Pacific.

The genus is characterised by having ctenoid scales, a lateral line which shows pored scales towards the head and notched scales towards the tail, the pelvic fins have two separated rays and the anal fin also has two spines and the possession of vomerine teeth but no palatine teeth.

Species
The following species are classified in the genus:
 Cocos triplefin, Axoclinus cocoensis Bussing, 1991
 Panama triplefin, Axoclinus lucillae Fowler, 1944
 Multibarred triplefin, Axoclinus multicinctus Allen & Robertson, 1992
 Cortez triplefin, Axoclinus nigricaudus (Fricke, 1997)
 Rubinoff's triplefin, Axoclinus rubinoffi Allen & Robertson, 1992
Axoclinus storeyae (Brock, 1940)

References

 
Tripterygiidae